Mohamed Tiaïba (born July 26, 1988) is an Algerian footballer who is currently playing for MO Constantine.

In June 2016, Tiaiba signed a one-year contract with Qatargas League club Al-Markhiya .

In September 2020, Tiaiba signed a one-year contract with Prince Mohammad bin Salman League club Al-Tai .

Honours
 Algerian Ligue Professionnelle 1 top scorer (1): 2015–16

References

External links
 
 

1988 births
Algerian footballers
CA Bordj Bou Arréridj players
Living people
MC El Eulma players
USM Sétif players
Algerian expatriate footballers
ES Sétif players
CS Constantine players
USM El Harrach players
RC Relizane players
Al-Shahania SC players
Al-Markhiya SC players
MC Oran players
AS Aïn M'lila players
Al-Tai FC players
People from Bordj Bou Arréridj Province
Algerian Ligue Professionnelle 1 players
Qatar Stars League players
Qatari Second Division players
Saudi First Division League players
Expatriate footballers in Qatar
Expatriate footballers in Saudi Arabia
Algerian expatriate sportspeople in Qatar
Algerian expatriate sportspeople in Saudi Arabia
Association football forwards
21st-century Algerian people